Andrzej Barański (born 2 April 1941) is a Polish film director and screenwriter. He has directed more than 45 films since 1970. His 1992 film A Bachelor's Life Abroad was entered into the 18th Moscow International Film Festival.

Selected filmography
 A Bachelor's Life Abroad (1992)

References

External links

1941 births
Living people
Polish film directors
Polish screenwriters
People from Pińczów County
Recipients of the Silver Medal for Merit to Culture – Gloria Artis